Nilore is a townsite-city in the Islamabad Capital Territory of Pakistan, located and established in the district limit of Islamabad. The city is located in the vicinity of Islamabad, and controlled under the Capital Territory Police (CPT) to ensure the law and justice in the city.

Nilore was established in 1967 as a research site for nuclear technology. It became a secret city and became one of the major research site for the integrated nuclear development to develop the atom bomb in the 1970s. It was closed to the public in the 1970s by the Ministry of Defence, and starting in 1972, the Pakistan Army Corps of Engineers acquired the entire city and immediately removed the local residents as they were paid heavy compensation. By 1973, the city communities had been removed, and fences and checkpoints had been established. Its relatively low population made acquisition affordable for the Ministry of Defence and the city was re-constructed by the Corps of Engineers. Facilities and institutes were expanded and new houses, homes, and facilities were built for the scientists and engineers who began their government research under extreme secrecy.

Since then,  Nilore's given nicknames include "Northern atomic city", "secret valley" and the "city behind the fence". Nilore hosted an apex scientific research in the 1960s led under Abdus Salam, and the scientific research and development still plays a crucial role in the city's economy and culture in general. Nilore is known for having one of the premier educational facilities and the Pakistan Institute of Nuclear Science & Technology (PINSTECH) and the Pakistan Institute of Engineering & Applied Sciences (PIEAS) are located at Nilore where they key research takes place. Since the 1990s, the city has been opened for the public and classified facilities were immediately closed by the government and re-located at unknown locations.

PIEAS is one of the finest institution in Pakistan. It has been ranked amongst the Top 400 Universities in World. It has been producing engineers for Pakistan for many decades. Students who are interested in studying in a beautiful and lovely location than PIEAS is amongst the best option. PIEAS is a better and an affordable option. It also provides various scholarship programs.

Raja Ghullam Sarwar(Late) was the famous personality in Nilore in 1970s.He was very honest,hardworking and careeing.All the peoples in nilore know him.

References

Hill stations in Pakistan
Islamabad
Nuclear weapons programme of Pakistan
Former closed cities